Snezhanka salad or Snow White salad is a traditional Bulgarian salad, which is made of strained yogurt, cucumber, garlic, salt, usually cooking oil, dill, sometimes roasted peppers, walnuts and parsley. Sometimes it is called milk salad (млечна салата, mlechna salata) or dry tarator salad (сух таратор салата, suh tarator salata).

Snezhanka (Snow White) salad derives its name from the fairy tale character Snow White. The reason for the name is the predominantly white color of the salad.

See also
 Tarator
 Tzatziki

References

Salads
Bulgarian cuisine
Appetizers
Snow White